The 2010 Future Champions Tournament is an elite under seventeen age-group football competition for leading Club teams from around the world, held in the Brazilian city of Belo Horizonte.

The competition in 2010 featured twelve teams from South America, Central America, North America, Africa, and Europe and took place between December 13 – 19.

Participants

 Club América
 Clube Atlético Mineiro
 FC Barcelona
 CR Vasco da Gama
 Cruzeiro EC
 SC Corinthians
 CA Peñarol
 D.C. United
 Everton F.C.
 Paris Saint-Germain
 C.F. Universidad de Chile
 Mamelodi Sundowns

Venues

The two venues chosen for the tournament were:

Squads

Group stage

Group A

Group B

Group C

Group D

Other games

Knockout stage

Playoffs

Semi-finals

Final

References

External links
 Official tournament website

Youth football competitions
International association football competitions hosted by Brazil
Future Champions Tournament